Aender Naves Mesquita (commonly known as Aender,  ; born 12 February 1983 in Barra do Garças, Mato Grosso, Brazil) is a former Brazilian-born Hong Kong professional footballer who currently plays as a midfielder for Hong Kong First Division League club Central & Western.

Club career

Shum Shui Po
On 28 October 2011, Aender joined Hong Kong First Division League club Sham Shui Po. Although unable to save the team from relegation, he was voted as Most Favorite Player by fans at the Hong Kong Top Footballer Awards.

Tai Po
Following the relegation of Sham Shui Po, Aender joined fellow First Division club Wofoo Tai Po, signing a 1-year contract.

On 4 May 2013, he scored in the 90th minute against Yokohama FC Hong Kong, changing the scoreboard into 2–1 for Wofoo Tai Po. As Citizen and Sunray Cave JC Sun Hei have won their match respectively, a win was critical for Wofoo Tai Po as 3 points could avoid relegation. However, in the last minute of stoppage time, Yokohama FC Hong Kong's Kenji Fukuda scored and thus sent Wofoo Tai Po into the Second Division.

Aender confirmed his departure following the relegation of Tai Po.

South China
On 31 May 2013, Aender joined First Division defending champions South China for free. He struggled to earn a starting spot in the first half of the season. In December 2013 he was loaned to Biu Chun Rangers for the remainder of the season.

Kedah
In April 2014 Naves joined Malaysian outfit Kedah.

1st return to Tai Po
In September 2014, Aender returned to Hong Kong Premier League club Tai Po.

2nd return to Tai Po 
At the start of the 2021–22 season, Aender returned to Tai Po after a stint around Hong Kong.

Tai Po announced the departure of Aender by mutual termination on 7 December 2022.

Central & Western 
On 9 December 2022, Central & Western announced the joining of Aender.

Career statistics

Club
 As of 31 May 2013. Following table only shows statistics in Hong Kong.

Remarks:
1 Others include 2013 Hong Kong AFC Cup playoffs.

Honors

Club
Tai Po
Hong Kong Senior Challenge Shield (1): 2012–13

References

External links
 
 Soccerpunter profile
 Esporte Futebol profile

1983 births
Living people
Association football midfielders
Brazilian footballers
Hong Kong footballers
Paraná Clube players
Ituano FC players
Clube Atlético Juventus players
Sociedade Esportiva do Gama players
Mogi Mirim Esporte Clube players
Clube Atlético Sorocaba players
Sham Shui Po SA players
Tai Po FC players
South China AA players
Hong Kong Rangers FC players
Yuen Long FC players
Hong Kong First Division League players
Hong Kong Premier League players
Expatriate footballers in Hong Kong
Hong Kong League XI representative players